The following is a list of judges of the Uttarakhand High Court since its inception on 9 November 2000. A total of 40 judges have served in the court (including sitting judges). The list has been arranged on the basis of date of retirement, or date of transfer with Chief Justices mentioned first.

Chief Justices of the Uttarakhand High Court

Judges of the Uttarakhand High Court

Notes
† – Died in office
‡ – Resigned
* – Incumbent

See also
Uttarakhand High Court
List of chief justices of the Uttarakhand High Court
List of sitting judges of the high courts of India
List of sitting judges of the Supreme Court of India
Bar Council of Uttarakhand
Uttarakhand Lokayukta
Government of Uttarakhand
Governor of Uttarakhand
Chief Minister of Uttarakhand
Cabinet of Uttarakhand
Speaker of the Uttarakhand Legislative Assembly
Leader of the Opposition in the Uttarakhand Legislative Assembly

References

 
U
Uttarakhand-related lists